Starfaring was the first science fiction role-playing game (RPG) published, released by Flying Buffalo in August 1976. Although it was the first to market, it didn't attract an audience, and was soon superseded by the much more popular Traveller published the following year.

Description
Starfaring is a two-player science fiction RPG "loosely based on Star Trek" that is set 700 years in the future, after humanity wins a war against robots. The world government loans money to adventurers so they can buy a small spacecraft and travel through a nearby stargate to explore space. The book includes information on: 
 creating scenarios
 building ships 
 creating crews and characters
 weapons and conflict
 rewards
 stores
 psionic powers
 hazards
 random star locations, star sypes, star systems, and planetary types
 life among the stars

Gameplay
Two people are required for play:
The gamemaster designs adventures, and then runs them. 
The player creates a ship and its crew. Unusually, the ship, not the crew, becomes the primary player character.

Shipbuilding
Ships have the following attributes: Size, Warp Drive, Brahma Crystal Power Supply, Shiva Crystal Weapons System, Vishnu Crystal Shields, and Instrumentation Computers.

Character creation
Character creation uses random rolls of three six-sided dice to generate Mentality, Psi, Physique, and Health.

Publication history
As game historian Erdei Jacint noted, following the successful launch of the first fantasy RPG, Dungeons & Dragons in 1974, "many small companies started producing fantasy RPGs, hoping to get rich. Clones rapidly appeared." Game designer Ken St. Andre was part of that movement, quickly designing several fantasy RPGs and supplements, including Tunnels & Trolls (published by Flying Buffalo) and Monsters! Monsters! (published by Metagaming Concepts). But as Jacint noted, "Due to the enormous amount of games with similar themes, the market started to stagnate. The time had come for a change. St. Andre took the first step in this direction." St. Andre decided to move away from fantasy and created a science fiction RPG titled Starfaring, which was published by Flying Buffalo in August 1976. As game historians Shannon Appelcline, Lawrence Schick, and Pascal Martinolli noted, it was the first science fiction RPG on the market, appearing several months before the publication of TSR's science fiction RPG Metamorphosis Alpha.

The first printing of Starfaring in 1976 was an 80-page saddle-stapled mimeographed softcover book with a black & white illustration by Ernest Hogan on the cover. More artwork by Hogan appeared in the book. A second printing that same year had a black spiral binding. The book did not make much of an impact on the market. In a player poll of 28 RPGs in the October-November 1976 issue of The Space Gamer, Starfaring received the lowest rating. As Lawrence Schick explained, "Starfaring shared [Tunnels & Trolls]'s loose and whimsical approach. Unfortunately, looseness is not a valuable commodity in SF games — to be credible, the technology and how it affects society must be clearly explained."

In 1977, Game Designer's Workshop released another science fiction RPG, Traveller, featuring professional typesetting, illustrations, and graphic design. It quickly proved to be far more popular than Starfaring. In a 1980 international listing of several hundred gamemasters and gaming groups that appeared in Issue 33 of Dragon, over one hundred identified that they played Traveller. In contrast, only two played Starfaring. 

In 2007, Outlaw Press published a revised and expanded second edition of Starfaring packaged as a 76-page digest-sized book. Ernest Hogan's original cover art was used, this time in full color.

References

External links

Flying Buffalo games
Role-playing games introduced in 1976
Science fiction role-playing games